Erzsebet "Bess" Bukodi is an Associate Professor in Quantitative Social Policy at the Department of Social Policy and Intervention, University of Oxford and a professorial fellow in sociology at Nuffield College, University of Oxford. She is a specialist in the role of education in social mobility.

History 
Bukodi received her M.A. in Economics and Sociology (1992) and PhD in Sociology (2002) from Budapest University of Technology and Economics.

She was a Max Weber Fellow of the European University Institute 2006-2007.

Bukodi is a member of the British Sociological Association, the ISA Research Committee 28 on Social Stratification and Mobility, and the Hungarian Sociological Association. She is a member of the editorial board of Work, Employment and Society and a reviewer for the European Sociological Review and American Sociological Review.

References

External links
 

Fellows of Nuffield College, Oxford
Academics of the University of Oxford
Living people
Year of birth missing (living people)
British sociologists
British women sociologists
Budapest University of Technology and Economics alumni
Academics of the UCL Institute of Education
Academic staff of the University of Bamberg
Academic staff of the European University Institute